Educational Psychology Review is a peer reviewed academic journal on the topic of educational psychology started in 1989, published by Springer Science+Business Media. Between 1999 and 2014, its highest impact factor was 2.83 in 2013, with 2020 impact factor of 8.705 (journal rank is #1 and #2 in the Educational Psychology and Education category, respectively). Its editor in chief is Fred Paas (Erasmus University Rotterdam and University of Wollongong).

It is considered one of the "big five" educational psychology journals (along with Cognition and Instruction, Journal of Educational Psychology, Educational Psychologist, and Contemporary Educational Psychology).

References 

Educational psychology journals
Springer Science+Business Media academic journals
Publications established in 1989
Quarterly journals